The Invisible Man is a film series by Universal Pictures. The series consists of The Invisible Man, The Invisible Man Returns, The Invisible Woman, Invisible Agent, The Invisible Man's Revenge and Abbott and Costello Meet the Invisible Man. The film series borrows elements from H. G. Wells's novel The Invisible Man, but it focuses primarily on the idea of a serum that causes someone to go invisible and its side-effects.

The series has been described as fragmented, with very few films in the series being connected. This is different from other Universal series of the time, such as Frankenstein and The Mummy. Some films in the Invisible Man series, such as The Invisible Man Returns and Invisible Agent, attempt to connect to the first film through characters who were related to Griffin. Others bear no relation to the original film beyond the inclusion of  a plot involving a mad scientist and a person who becomes invisible as a result of their experiments. Retrospective critics and film historians have commented that other films in the series borrow stories from previous films, with The Invisible Man Returns, The Invisible Man's Revenge and Abbott and Costello Meet the Invisible Man having the same stories as  Charlie Chan in London, The Walking Dead and The Invisible Man's Revenge respectively.

Films
Universal's The Invisible Man film series includes The Invisible Man, The Invisible Man Returns, The Invisible Woman, Invisible Agent, The Invisible Man's Revenge and Abbott and Costello Meet the Invisible Man.
Film historian Ken Hanke described The Invisible Man franchise as one of Universal's "most fragmented series". The authors of Universal Horror wrote that attempts to connect the series to the first film "proved awkward" unlike Universal's The Mummy and Frankenstein series. Examples of these connections include The Invisible Man Returns where the character Geoffrey Radcliffe (Vincent Price) receives the invisibility formula from Dr. Frank Griffin (John Sutton), a relative of Jack Griffin, and Invisible Spy where Frank Raymond is Griffin's grandson. In The Invisible Man's Revenge, the screenplay does not connect Robert Griffin with the previous Griffins who either created, understood and or operated with the invisibility formula.

Some installments were described as being rewrites of previous entries or other films entirely. Hanke described The Invisible Man Returnss story being "more than slightly similar" to the 1934 film Charlie Chan in London. In Phil Hardy's book Science Fiction, a review stated that the Invisible Man's Revenge was basically a rewrite of the 1936 film The Walking Dead. Abbott and Costello was described by the authors of Universal Horrors as being a semi-remake of Returns with the title character rewritten as a boxer framed for murder. Hanke described The Invisible Woman as being "curious offshoot" of the series, being directed by A. Edward Sutherland, who specialized in comedy films.

Production
Following the success of Dracula, Richard L. Schayer and Robert Florey suggested to Universal Pictures that an adaptation of H.G. Wells's The Invisible Man as early as 1931. Though promoted as being based on of H.G. Wells' novel The Invisible Man, the screenplay only follows the basics of the original novel. After going through several potential directors, including Florey, Cyril Gardner, E. A. Dupont, with James Whale eventually being chosen.  Shooting of the film began in June 1933 and concluded in late August.

Universal Pictures first announced the development of The Invisible Man Returns in March 1939, around the time Son of Frankenstein was performing well at the box office.
Hanke described the film's story being "more than slightly similar" to the 1934 film Charlie Chan in London. Though not a horror film, The Invisible Woman was originally written as a more serious horror film, about a mad scientist turning a woman invisible. The story was then passed on to Robert Lees and Fred Naldo who specialized in comedy. Gertrude Purcell, who had written the screenplay for the western comedy Destry Rides Again was hired to add a woman's perspective on the story.

Invisible Agent was announced under the title The Invisible Spy in early 1942. Universal first announced the plan for The Invisible Man's Revenge on June 10, 1943, with the hopes of having Claude Rains performing in the lead. Actor Jon Hall who was  Frank "Raymond" Griffin in Invisible Agent now portrays Robert Griffin, a killer who seeks revenge on men who framed him. A retrospective review in Phil Hardy's book Science Fiction commented that the film was basically a rewrite of the 1936 film The Walking Dead.

Prior to the first day of shooting The Invisible Man's Revenge, Universal's attorneys made a deal with H. G. Wells for the rights to make two more Invisible Man sequels between July 1943 and October 1951. Abbott and Costello Meet the Invisible Man was described by the authors of Universal Horrors as being a semi-remake of The Invisible Man Returns with the title character rewritten as a boxer framed for murder. Several lines of dialog from The Invisible Man Returns and some special effects were reused in the film.

Crew

Reception
In his book The Monster Movies of Universal Studios, James L. Neibaur commented on the series stating that outside the 1933 film The Invisible Man, "none of its sequels were particularly impressive" finding The Invisible Man's Revenge "average", The Invisible Woman "amusing" and Invisible Agent benefitting from the appearance of Peter Lorre in the cast, and The Invisible Man's Revenge "pedestrian".

Three films in the series led to Academy Award nominations for Best Special Effects. These included John P. Fulton, Bernard B. Brown and William Hedgcock for The Invisible Man Returns, Fulton and John Hall for The Invisible Woman, and Fulton and Brown for Invisible Agent.

Legacy

Unlike other Universal properties, The Invisible Man did not receive any immediate remakes such as those done by Hammer Film Productions.

A remake entered development as of February 2016, when Johnny Depp was announced to star with Ed Solomon writing the script, and Alex Kurtzman and Chris Morgan producing. Kurtzman and Morgan moved on to other projects the following November. In 2019, Universal announced and began production on the remake, written and directed by Leigh Whannell and produced by Jason Blum under his Blumhouse Productions banner. It stars Oliver Jackson-Cohen as the titular character, and Elisabeth Moss.

When a trailer was released that December, Robert Moran of The Sydney Morning Herald commented that it "met with the kind of confusion that could rattle a filmmaker, not to mention a studio. It seems monster movie fans, long-attuned to the bandage-wrapped antics of The Invisible Man of yore, weren't expecting Whannell's allegory on domestic violence trauma". Whannell commented on his change from the norm on the style, explaining that he knew there was going to be some backlash as he was "modernizing it and centering it not around the Invisible Man but his victim". Whannel compared his Invisible Man to the popular image of the character: "The iconic image of the Invisible Man is one of a floating pair of sunglasses, you know? I knew I had to move it away from that". The Invisible Man was released on February 28, 2020

See also 
 Universal Classic Monsters
 Dracula (Universal film series)
 Frankenstein (Universal film series)
 The Mummy (franchise)
 The Wolf Man (franchise)

References

Sources
 
 
 
 
 
 
 
 
 
 

Film series introduced in 1933
Horror film series
Universal Pictures franchises
Universal Monsters film series
Films about invisibility
Films based on The Invisible Man